Race walking events at the Summer Olympics have been contested over a variety of distances at the multi-sport event. There were three race walking events in the 2020 Summer Olympics: a men's and a women's 20 kilometres walk, and a men's 50 kilometres walk. The races were held in a final-only format.

The first men's events came at the 1908 London Olympics, which featured 3500 m and 10-mile distances. A 10-kilometre version was introduced at the 1912 Summer Olympics and it continued until 1952 (skipping three editions from 1928 to 1936). There was also a one-off 3000 m walk at the 1920 Antwerp Olympics. The men's 20 km walk became the standard short distance for men in 1956 and has continued since then. The longer men's event over 50 km was first held at the 1932 Summer Olympics and has been held continuously until the present day, except for a brief drop from the programme in 1976 – the IAAF held a World Championship for the event in protest and it was restored.

The first women's event was introduced at the 1992 Barcelona Olympics, 84 years after the first men's race. Held over 10 km for the first two editions, the women's event was extended to match the men's 20 km distance from the 2000 Sydney Olympics onwards. Women have never commonly competed internationally over 50 km, thus it has never been proposed as an Olympic event – as of 2012 it remains the only event on the Olympic athletics programme in which men compete, but women do not have an equivalent. The 50 km is also the longest distance race for an Olympic athletics event.

The Olympic records in racewalking were all broken at the 2012 London Olympics. In the 20 km walk Chen Ding holds the men's record of 1:18:46 hours, while Elena Lashmanova holds the women's mark of 1:25:02 hours. The men's 50 km record is 3:36:53 hours, set by Jared Tallent. Lashmanova's time was a world record – the first and so far only time a world record in racewalking has been set at an Olympic Games. Robert Korzeniowski is the most successful Olympic racewalker, having won the 50 km three times as well as the 20 km walk. Three other athletes have won four Olympic walk medals: Ugo Frigerio won three gold medals and a bronze in early competitions, Volodymyr Holubnychy won two 20 km walk titles as well as a silver and a bronze, and Jared Tallent won a gold medal in the 50 km along with two silver and a bronze.

The 1906 Intercalated Games, now not considered an official Olympic event, was the first venue for racewalking under the Olympic banner. Poor technique and judging significantly affected the 1500 m walk event, to the point where a rematch over 3000 m was added at short notice and judged by Constantine I of Greece.

Race walking has been particularly affected by doping, with many Russian world and Olympic champions testing positive for banned performance-enhancing drugs.

Medal summary

Men's 20 km walk

Multiple medalists

Medals by country

Women's 20 km walk

Multiple medalists

Medals by country

Defunct distances

Men's 3000 m walk

Men's 3500 m walk

Men's 10 km

Men's 10 miles

Men's 50 km walk

Multiple medalists

Medals by country

Women's 10 km

Intercalated Games
The 1906 Intercalated Games were held in Athens and at the time were officially recognised as part of the Olympic Games series, with the intention being to hold a games in Greece in two-year intervals between the internationally held Olympics. However, this plan never came to fruition and the International Olympic Committee (IOC) later decided not to recognise these games as part of the official Olympic series. Some sports historians continue to treat the results of these games as part of the Olympic canon.

Two walking events were held on the track at the 1906 Games: a men's 1500 m walk and a men's 3000 m walk. The first final to be held was the shorter distance. American George Bonhag, an absolute walking novice who had competed in the 5-mile run, came away as the winner after Canada's Don Linden, the eventual runner-up, had given basic technical advice to allow him to compete.

The 3000 m walk was held two days later as a last minute addition to the athletics programme, which was approved and also adjudicated by Constantine I of Greece after the dissatisfaction with the initial race. The entire walking field, minus Bonhag and Linden, was rearranged for the competition. Britain's Robert Wilkinson and Austria's Eugen Spiegler were again disqualified in the final stages for running, leaving Hungary's György Sztantics as the winner by a large margin.

References
Participation and athlete data
Athletics Men's 1,500 metres Walk Medalists. Sports Reference. Retrieved on 2014-05-19.
Athletics Men's 3,000 metres Walk Medalists. Sports Reference. Retrieved on 2014-05-19.
Athletics Men's 3,500 metres Walk Medalists. Sports Reference. Retrieved on 2014-05-19.
Athletics Men's 10 kilometres Walk Medalists. Sports Reference. Retrieved on 2014-05-19.
Athletics Men's 10 mile Walk Medalists. Sports Reference. Retrieved on 2014-05-19.
Athletics Men's 20 kilometres Walk Medalists. Sports Reference. Retrieved on 2014-05-19.
Athletics Men's 50 kilometres Walk Medalists. Sports Reference. Retrieved on 2014-05-19.
Athletics Women's 10 kilometres Walk Medalists. Sports Reference. Retrieved on 2014-05-19.
Athletics Women's 20 kilometres Walk Medalists. Sports Reference. Retrieved on 2014-05-19.
Olympic record progressions
Mallon, Bill (2012). TRACK & FIELD ATHLETICS - OLYMPIC RECORD PROGRESSIONS. Track and Field News. Retrieved on 2014-02-07.
Specific

External links
IAAF 20 kilometres walk homepage
IAAF 50 kilometres walk homepage
Official Olympics website
Olympic athletics records from Track & Field News

Olympics
Race walking